Stockton is a city in Cedar County, Missouri, United States. The population was 1,683 at the 2020 census. It is the county seat of Cedar County.

History
Stockton was platted in 1846. It was originally named Lancaster, but was renamed Fremont in 1847 in honor of John C. Frémont. In 1857 it was renamed again, in honor of Robert F. Stockton.

The Montgomery Archeological Site and Stockton Community Building are listed on the National Register of Historic Places.

Geography

Demographics

2010 census
As of the census of 2010, there were 1,819 people, 774 households, and 470 families living in the city. The racial makeup of the city was 97.0% White, 0.1% African American, 0.8% Native American, 0.4% Asian, 0.1% Pacific Islander, 0.1% from other races, and 1.6% from two or more races. Hispanic or Latino of any race were 1.4% of the population.

There were 774 households, of which 30.5% had children under the age of 18 living with them, 43.9% were married couples living together, 12.0% had a female householder with no husband present, 4.8% had a male householder with no wife present, and 39.3% were non-families. 35.3% of all households were made up of individuals, and 22% had someone living alone who was 65 years of age or older. The average household size was 2.26 and the average family size was 2.92.

The median age in the city was 43.7 years. 24.5% of residents were under the age of 18; 6.9% were between the ages of 18 and 24; 20% were from 25 to 44; 22.9% were from 45 to 64; and 25.9% were 65 years of age or older. The gender makeup of the city was 46.4% male and 53.6% female.

2000 census
As of the census of 2000, there were 1,960 people, 814 households, and 473 families living in the city. The population density was 921.7 people per square mile (355.3/km). There were 968 housing units at an average density of 455.2 per square mile (175.5/km). The racial makeup of the city was 95.66% White, 0.41% African American, 0.51% Native American, 1.12% Asian, 0.51% from other races, and 1.79% from two or more races. Hispanic or Latino of any race were 1.94% of the population.

There were 814 households, out of which 25.4% had children under the age of 18 living with them, 46.8% were married couples living together, 8.6% had a female householder with no husband present, and 41.8% were non-families. 38.9% of all households were made up of individuals, and 23.7% had someone living alone who was 65 years of age or older. The average household size was 2.14 and the average family size was 2.85.

In the city, the population was spread out, with 27.5% under the age of 18, 6.7% from 18 to 24, 20.7% from 25 to 44, 18.7% from 45 to 64, and 26.4% who were 65 years of age or older. The median age was 41 years. For every 100 females, there were 93.1 males. For every 100 females age 18 and over, there were 77.4 males.

The median income for a household in the city was $25,353, and the median income for a family was $34,427. Males had a median income of $22,574 versus $19,688 for females. The per capita income for the city was $14,540. About 7.0% of families and 14.8% of the population were below the poverty line, including 21.0% of those under age 18 and 10.5% of those age 65 or over.

Education
Stockton R-I School District operates one elementary school, one middle school and Stockton High School.

The town has a lending library, a branch of the Cedar County Library District.

Notable person
 Emil Liston (1890–1949), basketball coach and administrator, member of the Basketball Hall of Fame.

References

External links
 Historic maps of Stockton in the Sanborn Maps of Missouri Collection at the University of Missouri
• Cedar County Republican newspaper

Cities in Cedar County, Missouri
County seats in Missouri
Cities in Missouri